The Mokdong Stadium is a South Korean sports complex located in Mok-dong, Yangcheon-gu, Seoul. It consists of a multi-purpose stadium, a baseball stadium, and an artificial ice rink. It was opened on 14 November 1989. The main stadium hosted K League football matches from 1996 to 2001.

Facilities

Mokdong Stadium 
Mokdong Stadium is a multi-purpose stadium and is used mostly for association football and athletics. It was the home stadium of Bucheon SK between 1996 and 2000. The stadium holds 25,000 spectators (15,511 seated) and was opened in 1989.

Currently, the stadium serves as the temporary home ground for K League 2 club Seoul E-Land FC. It is expected that the club will play their home matches at least until the end of the 2023 season, while renovations are being made on the Seoul Olympic Stadium.

Mokdong Baseball Stadium 
 For details, see Mokdong Baseball Stadium.

Mokdong Ice Rink 
 Mokdong Ice Rink was used as a filming location for the television series Lovers in Paris, where Ki-joo, played by Park Shin-yang, and Soo-hyuk, played by Lee Dong-gun, played ice hockey. The venue was also used by the Asia League Ice Hockey teams Daemyung Sangmu and Daemyung Killer Whales.

See also 

Hyochang Stadium
Dongdaemun Stadium
Seoul World Cup Stadium

References 

Football venues in South Korea
Sports venues completed in 1989
Sports venues in Seoul
Multi-purpose stadiums in South Korea
K League 1 stadiums
K League 2 stadiums
Buildings and structures in Yangcheon District
1989 establishments in South Korea